Pedro Ricardo Barreto Jimeno  (born 12 February 1944) is a Peruvian prelate of the Catholic Church who has been Archbishop of Huancayo since 2004 and a cardinal since 2018.

Biography
Barreto was born in Lima, Peru, on 12 February 1944 and entered the Jesuit novitiate there. He studied philosophy at the Jesuit faculty in Alcalá de Henares, Spain, and theology in Lima. He was ordained a priest of the Society of Jesus on 18 December 1971 and took his final vows as a Jesuit on 3 October 1976.

On 21 November 2001, Pope John Paul II named him titular bishop of Acufida and Apostolic Administrator of Jaén in Peru. He was consecrated a bishop on 1 January 2002.

On 17 July 2004, John Paul appointed him Archbishop of Huancayo and he was installed there on 5 September.

He has headed the Justice and Peace Section of the Latin American Bishops' Conference (CELAM). He has fought the mining industry over its environmental impact on La Oroya. He has been vice president of the Pan-Amazonian Ecclesial Network (REPAM) and was a member of the organizing committee for the Pan-Amazon Synod of Bishops.

On 29 September 2012, Pope Benedict XVI made him a member of the Pontifical Council for Justice and Peace. Pope Francis made Barreto a Cardinal-Priest in the consistory of 28 June 2018, assigning him the titular church of Santi Pietro e Paolo a Via Ostiense.

In 2019 at the Synod of Bishops he said that those who oppose Pope Francis “want a static church, a church of doctrine, more than one of pastoral action. They want a church that is different to the one Jesus wants, which is a church of solidarity, a church that really responds to the needs of people, and of nature itself.”

See also
 Cardinals created by Francis
 Catholic Church in Peru
 Jesuit cardinal

References

External links

 

Living people
1944 births
People from Lima
Jesuit bishops
21st-century Roman Catholic archbishops in Peru
Cardinals created by Pope Francis
Peruvian cardinals
20th-century Peruvian Jesuits
Jesuit cardinals
Roman Catholic archbishops of Huancayo
Roman Catholic bishops of Jaén in Peru